Pyrgotis eudorana is a species of moth of the family Tortricidae. It is endemic in New Zealand and has been observed in both the North and South Islands. However it is regarded as a rare insect. This species inhabits native forest. Larvae exclusively feed on Muehlenbeckia australis and adults are on the wing from November to April. Adults are attracted to light.

Taxonomy

This species was first described by Edward Meyrick in 1885 using a female specimen collected at New Plymouth in February. Later that year Meyrick gave a more detailed description of the species. Meyrick, in 1911, described the male of the species. In 1928 George Hudson discussed and illustrated this species in his publication The butterflies and moths of New Zealand. In both 1971 and again in 1988 J. S. Dugdale confirmed the placement of this species within the genus Pyrgotis. The female holotype specimen is held at the Natural History Museum, London.

Description
Meyrick described the adult female of this species as follows:

In 1911 Meyrick described the adult male of the species as follows:

Distribution
This species is endemic to New Zealand. It has been observed in both the North and South Islands at locations such as Taranaki, Lake Horowhenua, Kaitoki, Wellington, and Dunedin. It is regarded as being rare.

Habitat 
This species inhabits native forest.

Behaviour 
Adults of this species are on the wing in November to April with the species appearing to be most abundant in December. This species has been collected via a black light trap.

Host species 

P. eudorana larvae feed exclusively on Muehlenbeckia australis.

References

Moths described in 1885
Archipini
Endemic fauna of New Zealand
Moths of New Zealand
Taxa named by Edward Meyrick
Endemic moths of New Zealand